Anthony Richard Scully (born 19 April 1999) is an Irish professional footballer who plays as a forward for EFL Championship club Wigan Athletic.

Club career

Early career
Scully joined West Ham United as a youth player in 2011. On 23 May 2016, West Ham announced Scully had signed his first professional contract with the club. During Scully's time at West Ham, he appeared as a triallist for Norwich City and Nottingham Forest.

Lincoln City
On 3 February 2020, after 37 appearances for West Ham's under-23's, Scully signed for League One club Lincoln City. On 15 February 2020, on his first start for Lincoln, Scully scored his maiden goal for the club in a 4–3 loss against Accrington Stanley. He would sign a new contract on 25 February 2021, keeping him at the club until the summer of 2023. His form during September 2021, would see him nominated for the EFL Player of the Month for League One.

Wigan Athletic
On 1 September 2022, Scully signed for Wigan Athletic for an undisclosed fee.

International career
Scully initially represented Ireland's under-15's, before switching allegiances to play for England's under-16 side. Scully later returned to the Irish set-up, captaining the under-17's.
He also has represented Ireland at u21 level.

Personal life
Scully's father, Tony, was a professional footballer, playing for Cambridge United, Crystal Palace, Manchester City and Queens Park Rangers.

Career statistics

References

1998 births
Living people
Sportspeople from Watford
Republic of Ireland association footballers
Republic of Ireland youth international footballers
Republic of Ireland under-21 international footballers
English footballers
England youth international footballers
English people of Irish descent
Association football forwards
English Football League players
Lincoln City F.C. players
West Ham United F.C. players
Wigan Athletic F.C. players